Nicholas Sambourn (fl. 1391) of Chippenham, Wiltshire, was an English politician.

He was a Member (MP) of the Parliament of England for Bath in 1391. His son was Nicholas Sambourn.

References

Year of birth missing
Year of death missing
English MPs 1391
People from Chippenham